William Henry Holbert (March 14, 1855 – March 20, 1935) was a catcher in the National League and American Association baseball leagues, from 1876 through 1888.  He holds the Major League record for career at-bats without a home run, failing to do so in his 2,335 at-bats. However, he was playing in an era when triples were more common than home runs, due to the spacious parks and poor quality of the balls used.

Bill Holbert started his career with the nascent Louisville Grays of 1876.  He sat out the 1877 year and, in 1878, played for the Milwaukee Grays, followed by the Syracuse Stars, and the Troy Trojans (both in 1879).  Holbert is also credited with managing one game, a loss, in 1879 while with the Syracuse Stars.

He stayed with the Trojans, and the National League, until 1883, when he joined the New York Metropolitans of the new American Association.  The Metropolitans traded him to the Brooklyn Bridegrooms after the 1887 season.  Bill Holbert retired in 1888, playing just 15 games with the Bridegrooms that year.

When the new Players' League started up in 1890, Holbert was one of the original umpires.

Major League Career

Bill Holbert's career batting average was a weak .208, with a slugging average at a very low .237.  Although batting averages were generally low in the 19th century and more so for catchers, Holbert's was lower than the average.  The 1879 Syracuse Stars, for example, had a team average of only .227, while Holbert hit .201.  Holbert's best year was 1881, with Troy, when he hit .278.  Even that year, nearly all – 46 out of 49 – of his hits were singles, and his on-base percentage was a mediocre .284.

Nonetheless, he was considered a good defensive catcher, although these talents have been overshadowed by those of Buck Ewing, considered by most to be best catcher of the 19th century.  When not catching, Holbert would often play the outfield; he started 11% of his games there.

See also
List of Major League Baseball player–managers

Notes

References

James, Bill (1988) Bill James Historical Baseball Abstract, Villard Books, New York.
Nemec, David, (2004), The Beer and Whisky League: The Illustrated History of the American Association—Baseball's Renegade Major League, The Lyons Press.
Sports Metrika, 1887 New York Metropolitans statistics
Sugar, Bert Randolph (2004) The Baseball Maniac's Almanac, McGraw-Hill, New York.
Morris, Peter (2009) Catcher, How the Man Behind the Plate Became an American Folk Hero, Ivan R. Dee, Chicago.

External links
New York Metropolitans 1884 schedule at Baseball Almanac
New York Metropolitans at Baseball Almanac

Major League Baseball catchers
Baseball players from Maryland
19th-century baseball players
Major League Baseball player-managers
Louisville Grays players
Milwaukee Grays players
Troy Trojans players
New York Metropolitans players
Brooklyn Bridegrooms players
Syracuse Stars (NL) players
People from Laurel, Maryland
1855 births
1935 deaths
Pittsburgh Allegheny players